Sri Devananda Gaudiya Math (also Matha, or Mutt) is situated at Teghori Pada in Nabadwip dham of district Nadia in the West Bengal state of India, and is a matha and prominent holy place of the Gaudiya Vaishnavas, as well the headquarters of the Sri Gaudiya Vedanta Samiti. It is located in the middle of the place earlier known as Koladvipa. The Math has been continuing as a famous religious spot thronged by thousands of devotees every year.

Gaudiya Vedanta Samiti

The Sri Gaudiya Vedanta Samiti or Gaudiya Vedanta Samiti (GVS) is the one of oldest Gaudiya Vaishnava missionary and monastic organisations, established in 1940 in British India. Its founder-president-acharya became Srila Bhakti Prajnana Kesava Gosvami Maharaja.

In April 1940, after the prominent guru-reformer Srila Bhaktisiddhanta Sarasvati Thakura Prabhupada entered aprakata-lila (departure), Srila Bhakti Prajnana Kesava Gosvami Maharaja as one of his disciples and former member of the defunct Gaudiya Math, established the Gaudiya Vedanta Samiti (lit. "Gaudiya Vedanta Society") in a rented building in Calcutta. He later purchased an extensive piece of land at Nabadwip on which he established Sri Devananda Gaudiya Math with a beautiful temple. The Math became the headquarters of a new mission with branches across India, predominantly in West Bengal, Assam and Odisha.

The monks, whose sannyasa guru was Srila Bhakti Prajnana Kesava Gosvami Maharaja, received the name Bhakti Vedanta, one of them, A.C. Bhaktivedanta Swami Prabhupada, the founder of the ISKCON.

According to official website of the organisation, its present president-acharya is Bhakti Vedanta Budhayan Goswami since 2020.

Inside the Temple

The following deities preside in the five chambers of the temple and samadhi mandir respectively:
 
Temple
 Srila Bhaktisiddhanta Sarasvati Thakura Prabhupada, 
 Sri Gauranga and Sri Radha-Vinoda-bihari, and 
 Sri Koladeva, or Varahadeva, the presiding deity of Sri Koladvipa.

Samadhi
 Srila Bhakti Prajnana Kesava Gosvami Maharaja
 Srila Bhaktivedanta Vamana Gosvami Maharaja

Nava-vidha Bhakti

The temple's nine towers each represent one limb of nava-vidha-bhakti, the nine types of devotional 
service.

 Hearing, 
 Chanting, 
 Remembering, 
 Serving the Lord's lotus feet, 
 Worshipping, 
 Offering prayers, 
 Engaging as a servant, 
 Serving as a friend, and 
 Completely surrendering oneself.

Nava-vidha Khandas

The matha is divided into the following nine parts (khandas):

 Paramartha-khanda – the printing press where devotional literature and magazines are produced.
 Kirtana-khanda – the place where sankirtana, lectures on Bhagavatam and other scriptures take place. 
 Upasya-khanda – the temple where the deities of Srila Sarasvati Thakura Prabhupada, Sri Gauranga, Sri Radha-Vinona-bihari and Sri Koladeva are worshipped.
 Sevaka-khanda – the place where the residents of the matha live.
 Bhoga-khanda – the storehouse and kitchen.
 Govardhana-khanda – the cow shed.
 Vaisnnava-granthagara-khanda – the library.
 Udayana-Khanda – the garden.
 Jnana-khanda – the bathrooms and latrines.

These sections are divided on the basis of activities favourable to bhakti, which are to be accepted and those unfavourable which are to be avoided. Jnana and karma which are devoid of bhakti are always to be rejected just as one rejects stools. For this reason the bathrooms and latrines of the matha are called Jnana-khanda.

It was Srila Bhaktisiddhanta Sarasvati Gosvami's long-held desire that a deity of Sri Koladeva be established on the Ganga's western bank in the old Kuliya-nagara. To fulfill this desire, Srila 
Bhakti Prajnana kesava Gosvami Maharaja has manifested the service of Sri Koladeva at the place.

The Past and the Present

 Srila Bhakti Prajnana Kesava Gosvami Maharaja – Founder Acharya.
(Pre-ISKCON and sannyasa guru of A.C. Bhaktivedanta Swami Prabhupada.
 Srila Bhakti Vedanta Bamana Goswami Maharaja – next Acharya. 
 Srila Bhakti Vedanta Paryataka Maharaja – present Acharya.
 Srila Bhakti Vedanta Acharya Maharaja – present Secretary.

Gallery

See also
Bhakti Prajnana Kesava Goswami

References

Footnotes

Bibliography
 Secondary sources
 
 
 
 

 Primary sources

External links

The Brahma-Madhva-Gaudiya Disciplic Succession and Its Unique Characteristics of Which We are a Part
Navadvipa Parikrama 2010 - Sripad Madhava Maharaja translated into English Srila Gurudeva’s short Bengali discourse.
Sri Srimad Bhakti Prajnana Kesava Goswami - The founder of Sri Devananda Gaudiya Matha.

Hindu monasteries in India
Hindu temples in West Bengal
Radha Krishna temples
Gaudiya Vaishnavism
1940 establishments in British India